The London Borough of Ealing is a London borough in West London. It comprises seven major towns: Acton (W3), Ealing (W5, W13, NW10), Greenford (UB6), Hanwell (W7), Northolt (UB5), Perivale (UB6) and Southall (UB1, UB2). With a population of 367,100 inhabitants, it is the third most populous London borough.

Ealing is the third largest London borough in population and eleventh largest in area, covering part of West London and a small part of Northwest London. It bridges Inner and Outer London. Ealing's administrative centre is in Ealing Broadway. Ealing London Borough Council is the local authority.  Ealing has long been known as the "Queen of the Suburbs" due to its many parks and tree-lined streets; the term was coined in 1902 by Ealing's borough surveyor, Charles Jones. This is reflected by the tree emblem seen on the Ealing Council logo and Ealing's coat of arms.

Location
The London Borough of Ealing borders the London Borough of Hillingdon to the west, the London Borough of Harrow and London Borough of Brent to the north, the London Borough of Hammersmith and Fulham to the east and the London Borough of Hounslow to the south.

The modern London borough was formed in 1965 under the London Government Act 1963. At the same time, the act abolished several local councils, some of which had covered areas now covered by the newly created London borough of Ealing. These were: the Municipal Borough of Ealing (which included Ealing, Greenford, Hanwell, Perivale, Tyford Abbey and Northolt), the Municipal Borough of Southall and the Municipal Borough of Acton.

Ealing is also the primary setting for The Sarah Jane Adventures, being the location of Sarah Jane Smith's home.

Within the borough are two garden suburbs, Brentham Garden Suburb and Bedford Park.

330 hectares within the borough are designated as part of the Metropolitan Green Belt.

Districts

Ealing borough is made up of seven major towns:

 Acton (W3)
 Ealing (W5, W13, NW10)
 Greenford (UB6)
 Hanwell (W7)
 Northolt (UB5)
 Perivale (UB6)
 Southall (UB1, UB2).

Parliamentary constituencies in Ealing
The London Borough of Ealing is represented by three Members of Parliament (MPs), elected in the following constituencies:
Ealing Central and Acton
Ealing North
Ealing Southall

London Fire Brigade
There are four fire stations within the London Borough of Ealing. Southall and Northolt have similar-sized station grounds and both house two pumping appliances. Southall attended some 700 incidents more than their Northolt counterparts in 2006/07. Ealing, with two pumping appliances, and Acton, one pump and two fire investigation units, are the other two appliances in the area. The ward of Northfield had over forty malicious calls made from it, more than twice as many as any other ward within Ealing.

Education

Ealing has a total of 91 state-run schools and nurseries. There are 13 high schools under the domain of the local education authority, 12 of which are either comprehensive, foundation or voluntary-aided, and one city academy.

A number of successful independent schools, including St Benedict's School (co-ed), the Barbara Speake Stage School (co-ed, ages 4–16), St Augustine's Priory (girls) and Notting Hill & Ealing High School (girls), are also located within the borough. The King Fahad Academy is an independent Saudi funded school within the borough.

The Japanese School in London is a Japanese international school in Acton.

Demographics

The borough of Ealing is ethnically diverse. In 2011, 49% gave their ethnicity as white, 30% as Asian, 15% as Black and 4.5% as of mixed or multiple ethnicity, the remaining identifying as Arab or other ethnicity. The main religions of the borough's population in 2011 were Christianity (44%), Islam (16%) Hinduism (9%) and Sikhism (8%); 15% stated they had no religion and a further 7% did not state any religion.

Ethnicity

Ethnicity-based communities

The borough has a long-standing Irish community which is particularly visible through the number of established Irish pubs in the borough and the popularity of Gaelic games in the community. Country flags for example can be seen flown on the outside or hung inside of various pubs in the area, especially on St Patrick's Day.  St Benedict's School has also had a long term affiliation with the Irish community in Ealing, as it is a Catholic school. Many Irish members of the Ealing borough attend Ealing Abbey which is linked to St Benedict's School.

Ealing has a large British-Polish community that owes its origins to the World War II refugees and Polish armed forces finding both cheap accommodation and work in the Acton area, which then had a high proportion of London's light engineering companies involved with government war contracts. This community has grown considerably including more shops with authentic Polish food since Poland joined the European Union and its migrant workers have been able to come to the UK freely; in 2011 the borough had the UK's highest proportion of Polish speakers at 6% of the population. This has also led to an increase in Polish social centres in the borough. The population is highly concentrated in Acton, Greenford and Perivale.

Southall in the west of the borough is home to one of the largest South Asian communities in the UK, the majority of whom are Sikhs. The community first developed in the 1950s. The Asian population makes up 80% of Southall Broadway ward as of 2011, a contrast compared to the 8% of Southfield ward in the borough's east.

The most noticeable Afro-Caribbean populations in the borough are in the areas of Northolt and Acton. Of the residents in the Northolt West End ward (as of 2011), 19.4% of them were of Afro-Caribbean heritage, with a relatively large proportion of these being Somali. 16.1% of the South Acton ward was black, whilst 15.9% of the East Acton ward was black. The Caribbean population of Ealing Borough is also mostly concentrated in these two wards of Acton.

In a speech to mark the 70th anniversary of the Indian Journalists' Association and of Indian independence on 15 August 1947 North Ealing MP Stephen Pound said: "There is North Ealing, South Ealing and Darjeeling" referring to the relatively large Asian population.

There are also churches and centres for London's Hungarian and Assyrian communities in South Ealing.

Other demographics
As of the 2011 census, Hanger Hill had, at 13%, the largest proportion of people aged 65 and over. The lowest were East Acton and Southall Green, at 8% each.

Sport and leisure

Ealing is home to Ealing Studios, and was a major centre of the UK film industry. Brentford F.C. draw a large amount of local support from the borough, although Griffin Park is situated just outside the borough, in the neighbouring London Borough of Hounslow.

The borough is represented in Rugby Union by Ealing Trailfinders and in Rugby league by the London Broncos.

The borough has four non-League football clubs Hanwell Town F.C. and Southall F.C. which both play at Reynolds Field in Perivale. the other two clubs are London Tigers F.C., which plays at the Avenue Park Stadium in Greenford and North Greenford United F.C., which plays at Berkeley Fields.

The borough is also home to one of the country's top athletics clubs, with Ealing Southall & Middlesex AC being based at Perivale Athletics Track.
The club has a successful history, with many national and international honours, including the double Olympic gold medallist, Kelly Holmes.
In 2020 the club celebrated their 100th anniversary.

Transport

Rail and London Underground
The numerous National Rail and London Underground stations in the borough are:
Acton Central railway station
Acton Main Line railway station
Acton Town tube station
Boston Manor tube station
Castle Bar Park railway station
Chiswick Park tube station
Drayton Green railway station
Ealing Broadway station
Ealing Common tube station
Greenford station
Hanger Lane tube station
Hanwell railway station
North Acton tube station
North Ealing tube station
Northfields tube station
Northolt Park railway station
Northolt tube station
Park Royal tube station
Perivale tube station
South Acton railway station
South Ealing tube station
South Greenford railway station
Southall railway station
West Acton tube station
West Ealing railway station

Travel to work
In March 2011, the main forms of transport that residents used to travel to work were: driving a car or van, 21.8% of all residents aged 16–74; underground, metro, light rail, tram, 18.0%; bus, minibus or coach, 9.2%; on foot, 4.7%; train, 4.0%; work mainly at or from home, 3.0%; bicycle, 2.0%.

Transport development

In April 2009 the council voted to call on Transport for London to look into the proposal for a North and West London Light Railway.

Town twinning
Ealing is twinned with:
 
 The district of Bielany, Warsaw, Masovian Voivodeship, Poland;
 The town of Marcq-en-Barœul, Nord, Hauts-de-France, France;
 The district of Steinfurt, North Rhine-Westphalia, Germany

References

External links

 LB Ealing official site
 Ealing Times
 Ealing Gazette
 Ealing.news

 
Ealing
1965 establishments in the United Kingdom